Fredy Brupbacher (28 November 1934 – 9 April 2018) was a Swiss alpine skier. He competed in the men's giant slalom at the 1960 Winter Olympics.

References

1934 births
2018 deaths
Swiss male alpine skiers
Olympic alpine skiers of Switzerland
Alpine skiers at the 1960 Winter Olympics
Sportspeople from Zürich
20th-century Swiss people